The Basilica of Sant' Apollinare in Classe ("Saint Apollinaris in Classe") is a church in Classe, Ravenna, Italy, consecrated on 9 May 549 by the bishop Maximian and dedicated to Saint Apollinaris, the first bishop of Ravenna and Classe. An important monument of Byzantine art, in 1996 it was inscribed with seven other nearby monuments in the UNESCO World Heritage List, which described it as "an outstanding example of the early Christian basilica in its purity and simplicity of its design and use of space and in the sumptuous nature of its decoration".

History 
Work on Sant'Apollinare in Classe started at the beginning of 6th century by order of Bishop Ursicinus, using money from the Roman banker Iulianus Argentarius. It was certainly located next to a Christian cemetery, and quite possibly on top of a pre-existing pagan one, as some of the ancient tombstones were re-used in its construction. At that time, Classe was located on the shore and was the ancient home port of the Roman fleet which gave its name to the town. Due to the accumulation of silt, the coastline has since moved  to the east.

The imposing brick structure was consecrated on 9 May 549 by Bishop Maximian and dedicated to Saint Apollinaris. The Basilica is thus contemporary with the Basilica of San Vitale of Ravenna. The relics of Saint Apollinaris are today in the Basilica of Sant'Apollinare in Classe

Architecture

Exterior
The exterior has a large facade with two simple uprights and one mullioned window with three openings. The narthex and building to the right of the entry are later additions, as is the fine 9th century round bell tower with mullioned windows.

Interior
The church has a central nave with two side aisles, a standard basilica design. An ancient altar in the mid of the nave covers the place of the saint's martyrdom. The church ends with a polygonal apse, sided by two chapels with apses.

The nave contains 24 columns of Italian marble. The carved capitals of the columns depict acanthus leaves, but unlike most such carvings the leaves appear twisted as if being buffeted by the wind. The faded frescos depict some of the archbishops of Ravenna, and date to the 18th century. The lateral walls are bare, but were certainly once covered with gorgeous mosaics. These were likely demolished by the Venetians in 1449, although they left the mosaic decoration in the apse and on the triumphal arch, the church's most striking features.

The upper section of the triumphal arch depicts, inside a medallion, Christ. At the sides, within a sea of clouds, are the winged symbols of the four Evangelists: the Eagle (John), the Winged Man (Matthew), the Lion (Mark), the Calf (Luke). The lower section has, at its two edges, the walls showing precious gems from which twelve lambs (symbols of the Twelve Apostles) exit. The sides of the arch show two palms which, in the Bible's symbolism, represent justice; under them are the archangels Michael and Gabriel, with the bust of St. Matthew and another unidentified saint.

The decoration of the apse date to the 6th century, and can be divided into two parts: 

in the upper one, a large disc encloses a starry sky in which is a cross with gems and the face of Christ. Over the cross is a hand protruding from the clouds, the theme of the Hand of God. At the side of the disc are the figures of Elijah and Moses. The three lambs in the lower sector symbolize the saints Peter, James and John, alluding the Transfiguration of Jesus on Mount Tabor.
in the lower one is a green valley with rocks, bush, plants and birds. In the middle is the figure of Saint Apollinaris, portrayed in the act of praying God to give grace to his faithful, symbolized by twelve white lambs.

In the spaces between the windows are the four bishops who founded the main basilicas in Ravenna: Ursicinus, Ursus, Severus and Ecclesius, all with a book in a hand. At the sides of the apse are two 7th-century panels: the left one, which has largely been restored, portrays the Byzantine Emperor Constantine IV granting privileges to an envoy of the Ravenna's archbishop. In the right panel are Abraham, Abel and Melchisedek around an altar, on which they offer a sacrifice to God.

The choice of the subject is closely linked to the fight against Arianism, as it restates both the divine and human nature of Christ, the former negated by the Arians.  In addition, the representation of Apollinaris among the apostles was a legitimation to Maximian as the first bishop of a diocese directly related to the early followers of Jesus, being Apollinaris, according to the legend, a disciple of St. Peter.

The Basilica's walls are lined by numerous sarcophagi from different centuries. They attest the changes of style from the 5th to the 8th centuries: from reliefs with human figures of the Roman sarcophagi, to Byzantine symbolism, to the increasing abstraction and simplification of these symbologies.

References

Further reading
Weitzmann, Kurt, ed., Age of spirituality: late antique and early Christian art, third to seventh century, no. 505, 1979, Metropolitan Museum of Art, New York,

External links

Photos
Ravenna Tourism site

549 establishments
6th-century churches
Palaeo-Christian architecture in Ravenna
Apollinare in Classe
Byzantine art
Buildings of Justinian I
Early Christian art